The 2021 Chicago White Sox season was the club's 122nd season in Chicago and 121st in the American League, and their first under new manager Tony La Russa since 1986. The White Sox played their home games at Guaranteed Rate Field. On September 23, after a win against the Cleveland Indians, the White Sox clinched the American League Central division for the first time since the 2008 season and became the first Major League team of the 2021 season to clinch their division. They finished the regular season with 93 wins, the third most in the American League and their most wins as a franchise since the 2005 season. By winning the American League Central, it secured the team their first back-to-back postseason appearance in franchise history after having clinched a wild card berth in the previous season. They lost to the Houston Astros in the 2021 American League Division Series.

Offseason

Manager
On October 12, 2020, the White Sox fired manager Rick Renteria after Renteria managed them for 4 season leading them to a playoff appearance in 2020. On October 29, 2020, the White Sox announced that they would hire Tony La Russa, who managed the team from 1979–1986. La Russa, age 76, became the oldest person to manage an MLB team. La Russa had not managed a team since the 2011 St. Louis Cardinals who won the World Series that year.

Transactions
 December 2, 2020: White Sox sign a one-year, $862,500 contract with pitcher Jace Fry. White Sox also non-tender outfielder Nomar Mazara and pitcher Carlos Rodón.
 December 7, 2020: White Sox trade pitchers Dane Dunning and Avery Weems to the Texas Rangers for pitcher Lance Lynn.
 December 10, 2020: Outfielder Adam Eaton signed a one-year, $7 million contract.
 December 30, 2020: White Sox sign a one-year, $1.375 million contract with outfielder Adam Engel.
 December 31, 2020: White Sox sign a one-year $2 million contract with pitcher Evan Marshall.
 January 15, 2021: White Sox sign contracts to three players – Liam Hendriks (four-year, $54 million), Lucas Giolito (one-year, $4.15 million), and Reynaldo López (one-year, $2.1 million). The White Sox also signed international players Yoelkis Céspedes and Norge Vera to both one-year, $2.05/1.5 million contracts respectively.
 February 1, 2021: Pitcher Carlos Rodón signed a one-year, $3 million contract.

Regular season

City Connect Jerseys
On May 28, the White Sox unveiled the City Connect Jerseys. They wore the jerseys for the first time on June 5 against the Detroit Tigers. The Jerseys are black with white stripes and the hat logo has a "CHI" instead of the "SOX" logo. The jerseys pay homage to the South Side of Chicago.

Season standings

American League Central

American League Wild Card

White Sox team leaders

 Minimum 3.1 plate appearances per team games played
AVG qualified batters: Abreu, Anderson, Moncada, Vaughn

 Minimum 1 inning pitched per team games played
ERA & WHIP qualified pitchers: Cease, Giolito, Keuchel

Record against opponents

Transactions
May 4, 2021: Outfielder Brian Goodwin signed a minor league contract. He eventually was called up to the active roster and made his season debut June 12 against the Detroit Tigers.
July 7, 2021: White Sox designated outfielder Adam Eaton for assignment.
 July 29, 2021: White Sox trade pitcher Konnor Pilkington to the Cleveland Indians for second baseman César Hernández. 
July 29, 2021: White Sox trade pitcher Bailey Horn to the Chicago Cubs for pitcher Ryan Tepera.
July 30, 2021: White Sox trade second baseman Nick Madrigal and pitcher Codi Heuer to the Chicago Cubs for pitcher Craig Kimbrel.

Achievements
Yermín Mercedes became the first MLB player of the modern era to start a season 8-for-8. He picked up five hits on April 2 against the Los Angeles Angels becoming the first player in White Sox history to record five hits in their first start and the following day he picked up three hits in his first three at bats. 
On April 14, Carlos Rodón pitched the twentieth no hitter in White Sox history against the Cleveland Indians. Rodón pitched eight perfect innings and retired the first batter he faced in the ninth inning before hitting Cleveland catcher Roberto Pérez in the foot. Pérez was the only base runner Rodón allowed. Rodón struck out 7 batters and threw 75 of 114 pitches for strikes.
Tony La Russa surpassed John McGraw for second all-time in career wins as a manager. This milestone in La Russa's career occurred as a result of the team's 3-0 victory over the Detroit Tigers on June 6.
The White Sox had four players selected to play for the American League in the 2021 MLB All-Star Game: Tim Anderson, Liam Hendriks, Lance Lynn, and Carlos Rodón. During the game, Lynn pitched one shutout inning, where he gave up no hits, one walk, and struck out catcher J. T. Realmuto of the National League. Hendriks pitched to close out the game for the American League and recorded the save, becoming the first Australian-born baseball player to do so. Anderson was substituted into the game as a defensive replacement, but was not able to record an at-bat.
On July 31, Seby Zavala became the first player in MLB history to hit his first three career home runs in the same game. His first two were hit off of the Cleveland Indians starter Triston McKenzie (with one of them being a grand slam) and his third came off of reliever Bryan Shaw.
On August 8 and 9, Eloy Jiménez became the first player in White Sox history to hit 2 Home Runs and 5 RBI's in back-to-back games. His two home runs on August 8 came off of Chicago Cubs pitchers Zach Davies and Michael Rucker and his two homers on August 9 came off of Minnesota Twins pitcher Beau Burrows. It was the first time a Major League player had at least two home runs and five RBIs in back-to-back games since Bryce Harper in 2015.
José Abreu surpassed Harold Baines for the third most home runs in White Sox history. His 222nd career home run with the club came as a game-tying hit in the ninth inning against the New York Yankees off of Chad Green on August 14th.
On August 16, Craig Kimbrel recorded his 1000th career strikeout. He became the fastest pitcher in Major League history to reach that career milestone, doing it in just over 613 innings pitched. The strikeout was recorded against Matt Chapman of the Oakland Athletics.
The White Sox pitching staff lead the American League in Complete Games (4), Hits allowed (1,205), Runs allowed (636), Earned Runs allowed (581), and Strikeouts (1588).
The White Sox finished with the best home record in the American League, going 53-28 (a .650 win percentage) at Guaranteed Rate Field.
Closer Liam Hendriks completed the season with the most saves in the American League (38). This was the first time that a White Sox pitcher accomplished such a feat since Bobby Thigpen in 1990. Hendriks also led Major League relievers in strikeouts (113) becoming the first White Sox pitcher to have 100 or more strikeouts in relief.
Dylan Cease led the American League in K/9 with 12.3.
The White Sox had 6 pitchers with 100 or more strikeouts. Dylan Cease (226), Lucas Giolito (201), Carlos Rodón (185), Lance Lynn (176), Liam Hendriks (113), and Michael Kopech (103). It is the most pitchers to have 100 or more strikeouts in one season in franchise history.
The White Sox had 4 pitchers finish in the top 11 of the Cy Young Award voting with Lucas Giolito (T-11th), Liam Hendriks (8th), Carlos Rodón (5th), and Lance Lynn (3rd).

Game log
On November 23, MLB announced that the White Sox would face the New York Yankees in the first MLB at Field of Dreams game in Dyersville, Iowa on August 12. This game was originally scheduled for August 13, 2020. The White Sox won the game 9-8 on a walk-off two run home run by Tim Anderson.

|-style="background:#fbb;"
| 1 || April 1 || @ Angels || 9:05pm || 3–4 || Mayers (1–0) || Bummer (0–1) || Iglesias (1) || 13,207 || 0–1 || L1
|-style="background:#bfb;"
| 2 || April 2 || @ Angels || 8:38pm || 12–8 || Kopech (1–0) || Heaney (0–1) || Hendriks (1) || 12,763 || 1–1 || W1
|-style="background:#fbb;"
| 3 || April 3 || @ Angels || 8:07pm || 3–5 || Guerra (1–0) || Marshall (0–1) || — || 12,043 || 1–2 || L1
|-style="background:#fbb;"
| 4 || April 4 || @ Angels || 7:37pm || 4–7 || Iglesias (1–0) || Ruiz (0–1) || — || 12,396 || 1–3 || L2
|-style="background:#bfb;"
| 5 || April 5 || @ Mariners || 9:10pm || 6–0 || Rodón (1–0) || Sheffield (0–1) || — || 6,436 || 2–3 || W1
|-style="background:#bfb;"
| 6 || April 6 || @ Mariners || 9:10pm || 10–4 || Giolito (1–0) || Margevicius (0–1) || — || 7,980 || 3–3 || W2
|-style="background:#fbb;"
| 7 || April 7 || @ Mariners || 3:10pm || 4–8 || Vest (1–0) || Foster (0–1) || — || 7,429 || 3–4 || L1
|-style="background:#bfb;"
| 8 || April 8 || Royals || 3:10pm || 6–0 || Lynn (1–0) || Keller (0–1) || — || 8,207 || 4–4 || W1
|-style="background:#bbb"
| – || April 10 || Royals || 1:10pm || colspan=7 | Postponed (Rain, Makeup May 14)
|-style="background:#fbb;"
| 9 || April 11 || Royals || 1:10pm || 3–4  || Holland (1–1) || Crochet (0–1) || Zimmer (1) || 7,695 || 4–5 || L1
|-style="background:#bfb;"
| 10 || April 12 || Indians || 7:10pm || 4–3 || Heuer (1–0) || Clase (1–1) || — || 7,393 || 5–5 || W1
|-style="background:#fbb;"
| 11 || April 13 || Indians || 7:10pm || 0–2  || Bieber (1–1) || Crochet (0–2) || Karinchak (1) || 7,102 || 5–6 || L1
|-style="background:#bfb;"
| 12 || April 14 || Indians || 7:10pm || 8–0 || Rodón (2–0) || Plesac (1–2) || — || 7,148 || 6–6 || W1
|-style="background:#fbb;"
| 13 || April 15 || Indians || 1:10pm || 2–4 || Civale (3–0) || Lynn (1–1) || Clase (3) || 7,049 || 6–7 || L1
|-style="background:#bbb;"
| — || April 16 || @ Red Sox || 6:10pm || colspan=7 | Postponed (Snow, Makeup April 18)
|-style="background:#fbb;"
| 14 || April 17 || @ Red Sox || 3:05pm || 4–7 || Ottavino (2–1) || Heuer (1–1) || — || 4,668 || 6–8 || L2
|-style="background:#bfb;" 
| 15 || April 18  || @ Red Sox || 12:10pm || 3–2  || Keuchel (1–0) ||Houck (0–2) || Hendriks (2) || 4,679 || 7–8 ||W1
|-style="background:#bfb;"
| 16 || April 18  || @ Red Sox || 4:10pm || 5–1  || Foster (1–1) || Pérez (0–1) || — || 4,601 || 8–8 || W2
|-style="background:#fbb;" 
| 17 || April 19 || @ Red Sox || 10:10am || 4–11 || Eovaldi (3–1) || Giolito (1–1) || — || 4,738 || 8–9 || L1
|-style="background:#bfb;"
| 18 || April 20 || @ Indians || 5:10pm || 8–5 || Rodón (3–0) || Plesac (1–3) || Hendriks (3) || 4,176 || 9–9 || W1
|-style="background:#bbb;"
| — || April 21 || @ Indians || 5:10pm || colspan=7 | Postponed (Rain, Makeup May 31)
|-style="background:#bfb;"
| 19 || April 23 || Rangers || 7:10pm || 9–7 || Heuer (2–1) || Cody (0–2) || Hendriks (4) || 8,969 || 10–9 || W2
|-style="background:#bfb;"
| 20 || April 24 || Rangers || 6:10pm || 2–1 ||Hendriks (1–0) || King (2–1) || — || 8,556 || 11–9 ||W3
|-style="background:#bfb;" 
| 21 || April 25 || Rangers || 1:10pm || 8–4 || Kopech (2–0) || Arihara (2–2) || — || 9,285 || 12–9 || W4
|-style="background:#fbb;" 
| 22 || April 27 || Tigers || 7:10pm || 2–5 || Ureña (1–3) || Giolito (1–2) || Soto (3) || 9,445 || 12–10 || L1
|-style="background:#bbb;" 
| — || April 28 || Tigers || 7:10pm || colspan=7 | Postponed (Rain, Makeup April 29)
|-style="background:#bfb;" 
| 23 || April 29  || Tigers || 4:10pm || 3–1  || Rodón (4–0) || Mize (1–3) || Hendriks (5) || N/A || 13–10 || W1
|-style="background:#bfb;" 
| 24 || April 29  || Tigers || 8:15pm || 11–0  || Cease (1-0)|| Boyd (2-3) || — || 7,628 || 14–10 ||W2
|-style="background:#fbb;" 
| 25 || April 30 || Indians || 7:10pm || 3–5 || Bieber (3–2) || Keuchel (1–1) || Clase (5) || 9,405 || 14–11 || L1
|-

|-style="background:#bfb;" 
| 26 || May 1 || Indians || 3:05pm || 7–3 || Lynn (2–1) || McKenzie (0–1) || — || 9,451 || 15–11 || W1
|-style="background:#fbb;" 
| 27 || May 2 || Indians || 1:10pm || 0–5 || Plesac (2–3) || Giolito (1–3) || — || 9,471 || 15–12 || L1
|-style="background:#bfb;" 
| 28 || May 4 || @ Reds || 5:40pm || 9–0 || Cease (2–0) || Hoffman (2–2) || — || 10,209 || 16–12 || W1
|-style="background:#fbb;"
| 29 || May 5 || @ Reds || 11:40am || 0–1  || Sims (1–1) || Hendriks (1–1) || — || 10,247 || 16–13 || L1
|-style="background:#bfb;" 
| 30 || May 7 || @ Royals || 7:10pm || 3–0 || Rodón (5–0) || Keller (2–4) || Hendriks (6) || 16,011 || 17–13 || W1
|-style="background:#bfb;" 
| 31 || May 8 || @ Royals || 6:10pm || 9–1 || Lynn (3–1) || Lynch (0–1) || — || 15,895 || 18–13 || W2
|-style="background:#bfb;" 
| 32 || May 9 || @ Royals || 1:10pm || 9–3 || Giolito (2–3) || Minor (2–2) || — || 12,102 || 19–13 || W3
|-style="background:#bfb;" 
| 33 || May 11 || Twins || 7:10pm || 9–3 || Crochet (1–2) || Alcalá (0–1) || — || 7,962 || 20–13 || W4
|-style="background:#bfb;" 
| 34 || May 12 || Twins || 7:10pm || 13–8 || Keuchel (2–1) || Happ (2–1) || — || 8,393 || 21–13 || W5
|-style="background:#bfb;" 
| 35 || May 13 || Twins || 1:10pm || 4–2 || Lynn (4–1) || Pineda (2–2) || Hendriks (7) || 8,188 || 22–13 || W6
|-style="background:#fbb;"
| 36 || May 14  || Royals || 1:10pm || 2–6  || Keller (3–4) || Giolito (2–4) || — || 8,574 || 22–14 || L1
|-style="background:#bfb;" 
| 37 || May 14  || Royals || 7:10pm || 3–1 || Heuer (3–1) || Junis (1–3) || Hendriks (8) || 9,823 || 23–14 || W1
|-style="background:#fbb;" 
| 38 || May 15 || Royals || 6:10pm || 1–5 || Minor (3–2) || Rodón (5–1) || — || 9,886 || 23–15 || L1
|-style="background:#bfb;" 
| 39 || May 16 || Royals || 1:10pm || 4–3 || Foster (2–1) || Davis (0–2) || — || 9,928 || 24–15 || W1
|-style="background:#bfb;" 
| 40 || May 17 || @ Twins || 6:40pm || 16–4 || Keuchel (3–1) || Happ (2–2) || — || 8,431 || 25–15 || W2
|-style="background:#fbb;" 
| 41 || May 18 || @ Twins || 6:40pm || 4–5 || Rogers (1–2) || Bummer (0–2) || — || 9,504 || 25–16 || L1
|-style="background:#bfb;" 
| 42 || May 19 || @ Twins || 12:10pm || 2–1 || Giolito (3–4) || Shoemaker (2–5) || Hendriks (9) || 8,608 || 26–16 || W1
|-style="background:#fbb;" 
| 43 || May 21 || @ Yankees || 6:05pm || 1–2 || Chapman (3–0) || Marshall (0–2) || — || 14,011 || 26–17 || L1
|-style="background:#fbb;"
| 44 || May 22 || @ Yankees || 12:05pm || 0–7 || Cole (6–2) || Cease (2–1) || — || 14,665 || 26–18 || L2
|-style="background:#fbb;" 
| 45 || May 23 || @ Yankees || 12:05pm || 4–5 || Chapman (4–0) || Bummer (0–3) || — || 14,007 || 26–19 || L3
|-style="background:#bfb;" 
| 46 || May 24 || Cardinals || 7:10pm || 5–1 || Lynn (5–1) || Kim (1–2) || — || 14,629 || 27–19 || W1
|-style="background:#bfb;" 
| 47 || May 25 || Cardinals || 7:10pm || 8–3 || Giolito (4–4) || Flaherty (8–1) || Hendriks (10) || 16,380 || 28–19 || W2
|-style="background:#fbb;" 
| 48 || May 26 || Cardinals || 1:10pm || 0–4 || Gant (4–3) || Rodón (5–2) || — || 14,791 || 28–20 || L1
|-style="background:#bfb;" 
| 49 || May 27 || Orioles || 7:10pm || 5–1 || Cease (3–1) || Tate (0–2) || — || 9,671 || 29–20 || W1
|-style="background:#bbb;" 
| — || May 28 || Orioles || 7:10pm || colspan=7 | Postponed (Rain, Makeup May 29)
|-style="background:#bfb;" 
| 50 || May 29  || Orioles || 1:10pm || 7–4  || Keuchel (4–1) || Harvey (3–6) || Hendriks (11) || N/A || 30–20 || W2
|-style="background:#bfb;" 
| 51 || May 29  || Orioles || 4:35pm || 3–1  || Lynn (6–1) || Means (4–1) || Hendriks (12) || 20,029 || 31–20 || W3
|-style="background:#bfb;" 
| 52 || May 30 || Orioles || 1:10pm || 3–1 || Giolito (5–4) || Tate (0–3) || Hendriks (13) || 21,067 || 32–20 || W4
|-style="background:#bfb;" 
| 53 || May 31  || @ Indians || 2:10pm || 8–6  || Heuer (4–1) || Karinchak (2–2) || Bummer (1) || N/A || 33–20 || W5
|-style="background:#fbb;" 
| 54 || May 31  || @ Indians || 5:35pm || 1–3  || Maton (1–0) || Lambert (0–1) || Clase (9) || 10,726 || 33–21 || L1
|-

|-style="background:#fbb;" 
| 55 || June 1 || @ Indians || 5:10pm || 5–6 || Bieber (6–3) || Cease (3–2) || Karinchak (7) || 7,132 || 33–22 || L2
|-style="background:#bbb;" 
| — || June 2 || @ Indians || 12:10pm || colspan=7 | Postponed (Rain, Makeup September 23)
|-style="background:#bfb;" 
| 56 || June 3 || Tigers || 7:10pm || 4–1 || Lynn (7–1) || Mize (3–4) || Hendriks (14) || 12,845 || 34–22 || W1
|-style="background:#bfb;" 
| 57 || June 4 || Tigers || 7:10pm || 9–8 || Hendriks (2–1) || Cisnero (0–3) || — || 21,637 || 35–22 || W2
|-style="background:#fbb;" 
| 58 || June 5 || Tigers || 1:10pm || 3–4 || Skubal (3–7) || Giolito (5–5) || Cisnero (1) || 21,719 || 35–23 || L1
|-style="background:#bfb;" 
| 59 || June 6 || Tigers || 1:10pm || 3–0 || Cease (4–2) || Ureña (2–5) || Hendriks (15) || 20,068 || 36–23 || W1
|-style="background:#bfb;" 
| 60 || June 8 || Blue Jays || 7:10pm || 6–1 || Crochet (2–2) || Thornton (1–2) || — || 12,761 || 37–23 || W2
|-style="background:#fbb;" 
| 61 || June 9 || Blue Jays || 7:10pm || 2–6 || Chatwood (1–2) || Bummer (0–4) || — || 14,438 || 37–24 || L1
|-style="background:#bfb;" 
| 62 || June 10 || Blue Jays || 7:10pm || 5–2 || Keuchel (5–1) || Ryu (5–4) || Hendriks (16) || 16,903 || 38–24 || W1
|-style="background:#bfb;" 
| 63 || June 11 || @ Tigers || 6:10pm || 5–4  || Hendriks (3–1) || Cisnero (0–4) || Bummer (2) || 14,163 || 39–24 || W2
|-style="background:#bfb;" 
| 64 || June 12 || @ Tigers || 3:10pm || 15–2 || Cease (5–2) || Ureña (2–6) || — || 15,913 || 40–24 || W3
|-style="background:#bfb;" 
| 65 || June 13 || @ Tigers || 12:10pm || 4–1 || Rodón (6–2) || Alexander (0–1) || Hendriks (17) || 14,093 || 41–24 || W4
|-style="background:#fbb;" 
| 66 || June 14 || Rays || 7:10pm || 2–5 || Feyereisen (3–2) || Lynn (7–2) || Fairbanks (3) || 18,024 || 41–25 || L1
|-style="background:#bfb;" 
| 67 || June 15 || Rays || 7:10pm || 3–0 || Keuchel (6–1) || McClanahan (2–2) || Hendriks (18) || 19,259 || 42–25 || W1
|-style="background:#bfb;" 
| 68 || June 16 || Rays || 1:10pm || 8–7  || Burr (1–0) || Fairbanks (1–1) || — || 20,098 || 43–25 || W2
|-style="background:#fbb;" 
| 69 || June 17 || @ Astros || 7:10pm || 2–10 || Urquidy (5–3) || Cease (5–3) || — || 21,795 || 43–26 || L1
|-style="background:#fbb;" 
| 70 || June 18 || @ Astros || 7:10pm || 1–2 || Pressly (4–1) || Crochet (2–3) || — || 30,898 || 43–27 || L2
|-style="background:#fbb;" 
| 71 || June 19 || @ Astros || 6:15pm || 3–7 || Valdez (4–0) || Lynn (7–3) || — || 35,210 || 43–28 || L3
|-style="background:#fbb;" 
| 72 || June 20 || @ Astros || 1:10pm || 2–8 || McCullers Jr. (4–1) || Keuchel (6–2) || — || 39,821 || 43–29 || L4
|-style="background:#fbb;" 
| 73 || June 22 || @ Pirates || 6:05pm || 3–6 || Bednar (1–1) || Crochet (2–4) || Rodríguez (9) || 9,847 || 43–30 || L5
|-style="background:#bfb;" 
| 74 || June 23 || @ Pirates || 11:35am || 4–3 || Cease (6–3) || De Jong (0–2) || Hendriks (19) || 10,406 || 44–30 || W1
|-style="background:#fbb;" 
| 75 || June 25 || Mariners || 7:10pm || 3–9 || Kikuchi (5–3) || Rodón (6–3) || — || 32,189 || 44–31 || L1
|-style="background:#bbb;" 
| — || June 26 || Mariners || 1:10pm || colspan=7| Suspended (Rain, makeup: June 27)
|-style="background:#fbb;" 
| 76 || June 27  || Mariners || 1:10pm || 2–3 || Sewald (5–2) || Hendriks (3–2) || Graveman (7) || 30,017 || 44–32 || L2
|-style="background:#bfb;" 
| 77 || June 27  || Mariners || 4:15pm || 7–5  || Bummer (1–4) || Dugger (0–2) || Hendriks (20) || 30,017 || 45–32 || W1
|-style="background:#bbb;" 
| — || June 28 || Twins || 7:10pm || colspan=7 | Postponed (Rain, Makeup July 19)
|-style="background:#bfb;" 
| 78 || June 29 || Twins || 7:10pm || 7–6 || Giolito (6–5) || Maeda (3–3) || Hendriks (21) || 17,382 || 46–32 || W2
|-style="background:#bfb;" 
| 79 || June 30 || Twins || 7:10pm || 13–3 || Cease (7–3) || Ober (0–1) || — || 16,803 || 47–32 || W3
|-

|-style="background:#bfb;" 
| 80 || July 1 || Twins || 1:10pm || 8–5 || Kopech (3–0) || Alcalá (1–3) || — || 24,944 || 48–32 || W4
|-style="background:#bfb;" 
| 81 || July 2 || @ Tigers || 6:10pm || 8–2 || Lynn (8–3) || Mize (5–5) || — || 18,185 || 49–32 || W5
|-style="background:#fbb;" 
| 82 || July 3 || @ Tigers || 3:10pm || 5–11 || Skubal (5–7) || Keuchel (6–3) || — || 17,230 || 49–33 || L1
|-style="background:#fbb;" 
| 83 || July 4 || @ Tigers || 12:10pm || 5–6 || Alexander (1–1) || Giolito (6–6) || Cisnero (4) || 15,342 || 49–34 || L2
|-style="background:#fbb;" 
| 84 || July 5 || @ Twins || 6:10pm || 5–8 || Ober (1–1) || Cease (7–4) || Robles (8) || 20,321 || 49–35 || L3
|-style="background:#bfb;" 
| 85 || July 6 || @ Twins || 7:10pm || 4–1 || Rodón (7–3) || Berríos (7–3) || Hendriks (22) || 18,437 || 50–35 || W1
|-style="background:#bfb;" 
| 86 || July 7 || @ Twins || 12:10pm || 6–1 || Lynn (9–3) || Pineda (3–5) || — || 19,664 || 51–35 || W2
|-style="background:#bfb;" 
| 87 || July 9 || @ Orioles || 6:05pm || 12–1 || Keuchel (7–3) || López (2–12) || — || 12,077 || 52–35 || W3
|-style="background:#bfb;" 
| 88 || July 10 || @ Orioles || 3:05pm || 8–3 || Giolito (7–6) || Eshelman (0–2) || Hendriks (23) || 26,391 || 53–35 || W4
|-style="background:#bfb;" 
| 89 || July 11 || @ Orioles || 12:05pm || 7–5  || Hendriks (4–2) || Wells (2–1) || Foster (1) || 11,600 || 54–35 || W5
|-style=background:#bbbfff
|| — || July 13 || colspan="10"|91st All-Star Game in Denver, CO
|-style="background:#fbb;" 
| 90 || July 16 || Astros || 7:10pm || 1–7 || McCullers Jr. (7–2) || Cease (7–5) || — || 34,516 || 54–36 || L1
|-style="background:#bfb;" 
| 91 || July 17 || Astros || 6:15pm || 10–1 || Giolito (8–6) || Odorizzi (3–5) || — || 34,304 || 55–36 || W1
|-style="background:#bfb;" 
| 92 || July 18 || Astros || 1:10pm || 4–0 || Rodón (8–3) || Valdez (5–2) || — || 34,148 || 56–36 || W2
|-style="background:#fbb;" 
| 93 || July 19  || Twins || 4:10pm || 2–3  || Duffey (2–2) || Crochet (2–5) || Robles (10) || N/A || 56–37 || L1
|-style="background:#bfb;" 
| 94 || July 19  || Twins || 7:35pm || 5–3  || Bummer (2–4) || Berríos (7–4) || — || 18,272 || 57–37 || W1
|-style="background:#bfb;" 
| 95 || July 20 || Twins || 7:10pm || 9–5 || Burr (2–0) || Alcalá (2–4) || — || 17,703 || 58–37 || W2
|-style="background:#fbb;" 
| 96 || July 21 || Twins || 7:10pm || 2–7 || Pineda (4–5) || Cease (7–6) || — || 25,600 || 58–38 || L1
|-style="background:#fbb;" 
| 97 || July 23 || @ Brewers || 7:10pm || 1–7 || Houser (6–5) || Giolito (8–7) || — || 32,714 || 58–39 || L2
|-style="background:#fbb;" 
| 98 || July 24 || @ Brewers || 6:10pm || 1–6 || Burnes (6–4) || Rodón (8–4) || — || 41,686 || 58–40 || L3
|-style="background:#bfb;" 
| 99 || July 25 || @ Brewers || 6:08pm || 3–1 || Lynn (10–3) || Woodruff (7–5) || Hendriks (24) || 36,887 || 59–40 || W1
|-style="background:#fbb;"
| 100 || July 26 || @ Royals || 7:10pm || 3–4 || Minor (8–8) || Keuchel (7–4) || Barlow (6) || 12,384 || 59–41 || L1
|-style="background:#bfb;"
| 101 || July 27 || @ Royals || 7:10pm || 5–3 || López (1–0) || Zimmer (4–1) || Hendriks (25) || 14,298 || 60–41 || W1
|-style="background:#fbb;"
| 102 || July 28 || @ Royals || 7:10pm || 2–3  || Barlow (3–3) || Burr (2–1) || — || 13,626 || 60–42 || L1
|-style="background:#fbb;"
| 103 || July 29 || @ Royals || 1:10pm || 0–5 || Hernández (2–1) || Rodón (8–5) || — || 11,210 || 60–43 || L2
|-style="background:#bfb;" 
| 104 || July 30 || Indians || 7:10pm || 6–4 || Ruiz (1–1) || Karinchak (7–3) || Hendriks (26) || 36,123 || 61–43 || W1
|-style="background:#fbb;" 
| 105 || July 31 || Indians || 6:10pm || 11–12 || Garza (1–0) || Kopech (3–1) || Clase (13) || 35,866 || 61–44 || L1
|-

|-style="background:#bfb;" 
| 106 || August 1 || Indians || 1:10pm || 2–1 || Hendriks (5–2) || Wittgren (2–4) || — || 34,344 || 62–44 || W1
|-style="background:#bfb;"
| 107 || August 3 || Royals || 7:10pm || 7–1 || Cease (8–6) || Bubic (3–5) || — || 19,369 || 63–44 || W2
|-style="background:#fbb;" 
| 108 || August 4 || Royals || 7:10pm || 1–9 || Hernández (3–1) || Giolito (8–8) || — || 22,793 || 63–45 || L1
|-style="background:#fbb;" 
| 109 || August 5 || Royals || 7:10pm || 2–3 || Lynch (2–3) || Keuchel (7–5) || Brentz (1) || 23,589 || 63–46 || L2
|-style="background:#bfb;" 
| 110 || August 6 || @ Cubs || 1:20pm || 8–6  || Hendriks (6–2) || Rodríguez (0–2) || — || 39,539 || 64–46 || W1
|-style="background:#bfb;" 
| 111 || August 7 || @ Cubs || 1:20pm || 4–0 || Rodón (9–5) || Alzolay (4–12) || — || 40,077 || 65–46 || W2
|-style="background:#bfb;" 
| 112 || August 8 || @ Cubs || 6:09pm || 9–3 || Cease (9–6) || Davies (6–9) || — || 39,412 || 66–46 || W3
|-style="background:#bfb;" 
| 113 || August 9 || @ Twins || 7:10pm || 11–1 || Giolito (9–8) || Burrows (0–1) || — || 17,858 || 67–46 || W4
|-style="background:#fbb;" 
| 114 || August 10 || @ Twins || 7:10pm || 3–4 || Jax (3–1) || Keuchel (7–6) || Colomé (6) || 18,302 || 67–47 || L1
|-style="background:#fbb;"
| 115 || August 11 || @ Twins || 12:10pm || 0–1 || Thielbar (4–0) || Ruiz (1–2) || Colomé (7) || 22,370 || 67–48 || L2
|-style="background:#bfb;" 
| 116 || August 12† || Yankees (Field of Dreams game)|| 6:00pm || 9–8 || Hendriks (7–2) || Britton (0–1) || — || 7,832 || 68–48 || W1
|-style="background:#fbb;" 
| 117 || August 14 || Yankees || 6:10pm || 5–7  || Green (7–5) || Hendriks (7–3) || Abreu (1) || 38,477 || 68–49 || L1
|-style="background:#fbb;" 
| 118 || August 15 || Yankees || 1:10pm || 3–5 || Cortés Jr. (1–1) || Giolito (9–9) || Peralta (4) || 37,696 || 68–50 || L2
|-style="background:#bfb;" 
| 119 || August 16 || Athletics || 7:10pm || 5–2 || Keuchel (8–6) || Montas (9–9) || Hendriks (27) || 19,410 || 69–50 || W1
|-style="background:#bfb;" 
| 120 || August 17 || Athletics || 7:10pm || 9–0 || López (2–0) || Bassitt (12–4) || — || 21,025 || 70–50 || W2
|-style="background:#bfb;" 
| 121 || August 18 || Athletics || 7:10pm || 3–2 || Crochet (3–5) || Blackburn (0–1) || Hendriks (28) || 22,780 || 71–50 || W3
|-style="background:#fbb;" 
| 122 || August 19 || Athletics || 1:10pm || 4–5 || Irvin (9–11) || Kopech (3–2) || Trivino (20) || 23,853 || 71–51 || L1
|-style="background:#bfb;" 
| 123 || August 20 || @ Rays || 6:10pm || 7–5  || Hendriks (8–3) || Kittredge (8–2) || Tepera (2) || 13,178 || 72–51 || W1
|-style="background:#fbb;" 
| 124 || August 21 || @ Rays || 12:10pm || 4–8 || Patiño (3–3) || Keuchel (8–7) || McHugh (1) || 22,275 || 72–52 || L1
|-style="background:#fbb;" 
| 125 || August 22 || @ Rays || 12:10pm || 0–9 || Armstrong (1–0) || López (2–1) || Fleming (1) || 16,696 || 72–53 || L2
|-style="background:#fbb;"
| 126 || August 23 || @ Blue Jays || 6:07pm || 1–2 || Mayza (3–1) || Kimbrel (2–4) || Romano (12) || 14,640 || 72–54 || L3
|-style="background:#bfb;" 
| 127 || August 24 || @ Blue Jays || 6:07pm || 5–2 || Cease (10–6) || Berríos (8–7) || Hendriks (29) || 14,553 || 73–54 || W1
|-style="background:#fbb;" 
| 128 || August 25 || @ Blue Jays || 6:07pm || 1–3 || Mayza (4–1) || Bummer (2–5) || Romano (13) || 14,276 || 73–55 || L1
|-style="background:#bfb;" 
| 129 || August 26 || @ Blue Jays || 2:07pm || 10–7 || Rodón (10–5) || Ryu (12–7) || Kimbrel (24) || 14,958 || 74–55 || W1
|-style="background:#bfb;"
| 130 || August 27 || Cubs || 7:10pm || 17–13 || López (3–1) || Sampson (0–1) || — || 37,892 || 75–55 || W2
|-style="background:#fbb;"  
| 131 || August 28 || Cubs || 6:10pm || 0–7 || Mills (6–6) || Lynn (10–4) || — || 38,668 || 75–56 || L1
|-style="background:#bfb;" 
| 132 || August 29 || Cubs || 1:10pm || 13–1 || Cease (11–6) || Hendricks (14–6) || — || 38,565 || 76–56 || W1
|-style="background:#bfb;" 
| 133 || August 31 || Pirates || 7:10pm || 4–2 || Kopech (4–2) || Wilson (2–6) || Hendriks (30) || 19,221 || 77–56 || W2
|-
|colspan=11 style="text-align:left"|
|-valign="top"

|-style="background:#bfb;" 
| 134 || September 1 || Pirates || 7:10pm || 6–3 || Rodón (11–5) || Kranick (1–3) || Hendriks (31) || 19,231 || 78–56 || W3
|-style="background:#fbb;"  
| 135 || September 3 || @ Royals || 7:10pm || 2–7 || Hernández (5–1) || Keuchel (8–8) || — || 14,210 || 78–57 || L1
|-style="background:#bfb;" 
| 136 || September 4 || @ Royals || 6:10pm || 10–7 || Kimbrel (3–4) || Lynch (4–4) || Hendriks (32) || 18,800 || 79–57 || W1
|-style="background:#fbb;" 
| 137 || September 5 || @ Royals || 1:10pm || 0–6 || Singer (4–9) || Cease (11–7) || — || 19,696 || 79–58 || L1
|-style="background:#bfb;" 
| 138 || September 7 || @ Athletics || 8:40pm || 6–3 || Lambert (1–1) || Puk (0–3) || Hendriks (33) || 4,556 || 80–58 || W1
|-style="background:#fbb;" 
| 139 || September 8 || @ Athletics || 8:40pm || 1–5 || Montas (12–9) || Keuchel (8–9) || — || 8,147 || 80–59 || L1
|-style="background:#fbb;" 
| 140 || September 9 || @ Athletics || 2:37pm || 1–3 || Manaea (9–9) || López (3–2) || Chafin (3) || 5,078 || 80–60 || L2
|-style="background:#bfb;" 
| 141 || September 10 || Red Sox || 7:10pm || 4–3 || Rodón (12–5) || Houck (0–4) || Hendriks (34) || 34,365 || 81–60 || W1
|-style="background:#fbb;" 
| 142 || September 11 || Red Sox || 6:10pm || 8–9  || Whitlock (8–3) || Wright (0–1) || Taylor (1) || 37,854 || 81–61 || L1
|-style="background:#bfb;" 
| 143 || September 12 || Red Sox || 1:10pm || 2–1 || Kimbrel (4–4) || Whitlock (8–4) || — || 36,178 || 82–61 || W1
|-style="background:#bfb;" 
| 144 || September 14 || Angels || 7:10pm || 9–3 || Bummer (3–5) || Naughton (0–2) || — || 21,848 || 83–61 || W2
|-style="background:#fbb;" 
| 145 || September 15 || Angels || 7:10pm || 2–3 || Mayers (5–5) || Kopech (3–4) || Iglesias (32) || 26,505 || 83–62 || L1
|-style="background:#fbb;" 
| 146 || September 16 || Angels || 1:10pm || 3–9 || Cobb (8–3) || López (3–3) || — || 27,098 || 83–63 || L2
|-style="background:#bfb;" 
| 147 || September 17 || @ Rangers || 7:05pm || 8–0 || Cease (12–7) || Hearn (6–5) || — || 28,288 || 84–63 || W1
|-style="background:#fbb;" 
| 148 || September 18 || @ Rangers || 6:05pm || 1–2 || Anderson (1–2) || Lynn (10–5) || Barlow (7) || 31,121 || 84–64 || L1
|-style="background:#bfb;" 
| 149 || September 19 || @ Rangers || 1:35pm || 7–2 || Giolito (10–9) || Lyles (9–12) || — || 24,918 || 85–64 || W1
|-style="background:#fbb;"
| 150 || September 20 || @ Tigers || 5:40pm || 3–4 || Hutchison (2–1) || Kimbrel (4–5) || Lange (1) || 12,884 || 85–65 || L1
|-style="background:#fbb;" 
| 151 || September 21 || @ Tigers || 12:10pm || 3–5 || Garcia (3–2) || Fry (0–1) || Fulmer (11) || 10,585 || 85–66 || L2
|-style="background:#bbb;" 
| — || September 22 || @ Tigers || 12:10pm || colspan=7 | Postponed (Rain, Makeup September 27)
|-style="background:#bfb;" 
| 152 || September 23  || @ Indians || 12:10pm || 7–2  || Bummer (4–5) || Civale (11–5) || — || 11,851 || 86–66 || W1
|-style="background:#fbb;" 
| 153 || September 23  || @ Indians || 5:10pm || 3–5  || Clase (4–5) || Ruiz (1–3) || — || 11,336 || 86–67 || L1
|-style="background:#bfb;" 
| 154 || September 24 || @ Indians || 6:10pm || 1–0 || Cease (13–7) || Stephan (3–1) || Hendriks (35) || 18,756 || 87–67 || W1
|-style="background:#fbb;" 
| 155 || September 25 || @ Indians || 6:15pm || 0–6 || Morgan (4–7) || Lynn (10–6) || — || 24,082 || 87–68 || L1
|-style="background:#bfb;" 
| 156 || September 26 || @ Indians || 12:10pm || 5–2 || Giolito (11–9) || McKenzie (5–8) || Hendriks (36) || 21,957 || 88–68 || W1
|-style="background:#bfb;" 
| 157 || September 27 || @ Tigers || 12:10pm || 8–7 || Keuchel (9–9) || Manning (4–7) || Hendriks (37) || 11,044 || 89–68 || W2
|-style="background:#bfb;" 
| 158 || September 28 || Reds || 7:10pm || 7–1 || López (4–3) || O'Brien (0–1) || — || 25,242 || 90–68 || W3
|-style="background:#bfb;" 
| 159 || September 29 || Reds || 7:10pm || 6–1 || Rodón (13–5) || Gray (7–9) || — || 23,018 || 91–68 || W4
|-style="background:#bfb;" 
| 160 || October 1 || Tigers || 7:10pm || 8–1 || Lynn (11–6) || Peralta (4–5) || — || 30,729 || 92–68 || W5
|-style="background:#bfb;" 
| 161 || October 2 || Tigers || 6:10pm || 5–4 || Bummer (5–5) || Funkhouser (7–4) || Hendriks (38) || 36,320 || 93–68 || W6
|-style="background:#fbb;" 
| 162 || October 3 || Tigers || 2:10pm || 2–5 || Jiménez (6–1) || López (4–4) || — || 30,722 || 93–69 || L1
|-

|- style="text-align:center;"
| Legend:       = Win       = Loss       = PostponementBold = White Sox team member

Detailed records

Postseason

Game log

|-style="background:#fbb;" 
| 1 || October 7 || @ Astros || 1–6 || McCullers Jr. (1–0) || Lynn (0–1) || — || 3:07pm || 0–1 || 40,497 || L1
|-style="background:#fbb;" 
| 2 || October 8 || @ Astros || 4–9 || Stanek (1–0) || Bummer (0–1) || — || 1:07pm || 0–2 || 41,315 || L2
|-style="background:#bfb;" 
| 3 || October 10 || Astros || 12–6 || Kopech (1–0) || García (0–1) || — || 7:07pm || 1–2 || 40,288 || W1
|-style="background:#bbb;" 
| — || October 11 || Astros || colspan=8| Postponed (rain, makeup October 12)
|-style="background:#fbb;"
| 4 || October 12 || Astros || 1–10 || García (1–1) || Rodón (0–1) || — || 1:07pm || 1–3 || 40,170 || L1
|-

Postseason rosters

| style="text-align:left" | 
Pitchers: 27 Lucas Giolito 31 Liam Hendriks 33 Lance Lynn 34 Michael Kopech 39 Aaron Bummer 40 Reynaldo López 45 Garrett Crochet 46 Craig Kimbrel 51 Ryan Tepera 55 Carlos Rodón 66 José Ruiz 84 Dylan Cease 
Catchers: 21 Zack Collins 24 Yasmani Grandal 
Infielders: 7 Tim Anderson 10 Yoán Moncada 12 César Hernández 20 Danny Mendick 28 Leury García 32 Gavin Sheets 79 José Abreu
Outfielders: 0 Billy Hamilton 15 Adam Engel 25 Andrew Vaughn 74 Eloy Jiménez 88 Luis Robert
|- valign="top"

Roster

Player stats

Batting
Note: G = Games played; AB = At bats; R = Runs scored; H = Hits; 2B = Doubles; 3B = Triples; HR = Home runs; RBI = Runs batted in; AVG = Batting average; OBP = On-base percentage; SB = Stolen bases

Pitching
Note: W = Wins; L = Losses; ERA = Earned run average; WHIP = Walks and hits per inning pitched; G = Games pitched; GS = Games started; SV = Saves; IP = Innings pitched; R = Total runs allowed; ER = Earned runs allowed; BB = Walks allowed; K = Strikeouts

Awards and honors
Yermín Mercedes was named the AL Player of the Week on April 5 after going 9-for-14 with a .643 batting average, a 1.643 OPS, 1 home run, and 6 RBIs. Mercedes was then named the Rookie of the Month in the month of April for the number of games played.

Liam Hendriks was named the AL Reliever of the Month in the month of May after not allowing an earned run in 11 2/3 innings pitched for the White Sox while striking out 19 batters and recording eight saves in eight opportunities. Hendriks later earned AL Reliever of the Month honors again for September/October after going 8-for-8 in save opportunities while only allowing six hits, no walks, and striking out 21 batters in 13 2/3 innings. For his efforts, Hendriks won the Mariano Rivera AL Reliever of the Year Award for the second year in a row while becoming the second White Sox player to win reliever of the year and the first since Bobby Thigpen in 1990.

José Abreu was named the AL Player of the Month in August. Abreu batted .330/.382/.661 hitting 10 Home Runs and 25 RBI's with an OPS of 1.043.

Despite not having a great season stat-wise, Dallas Keuchel won his 5th Fielding Bible Award for the pitcher position and passed former White Sox pitcher Mark Buehrle for most Fielding Bible Awards won by a pitcher since the Award was first handed out in 2006. Keuchel also won his 5th Gold Glove Award. Keuchel had a career-high 12 defensive runs saved, most by a pitcher since Buehrle had 12 in 2012.

Farm system

References

External links
2021 Chicago White Sox at Baseball Reference
2021 Chicago White Sox season Official Site
2021 Chicago White Sox season at ESPN

Chicago White Sox seasons
Chicago White Sox
White Sox
White Sox
2021